HMC Nimrod is a Border Force coastal patrol vessel of the United Kingdom, formerly Euan, an Autonomous Rescue and Recovery Craft operated by BP.  She was originally built by Delta Power Group, Stockport and was operated by BP as a rescue boat aboard larger offshore support vessels. Euan was acquired by the UK Border Force in July 2016 and renamed HMC Nimrod.

Construction
Nimrod is one of eight coastal patrol vessels of the UK Border Force.  Built in 2006 Nimrod was originally named Euan and served as an Autonomous Rescue and Recovery Craft in the North Sea for offshore projects. Euan was operated as a daughter craft from a larger offshore support vessel and launched when needed via a davit. The design includes a deep-vee hull design constructed from fibre-reinforced plastic. The design is also self-righting and can return to the upright position if capsized.

After service with BP from 2006 to 2016, Euan was sold to the UK Border Force for use as a coastal patrol vessel. The vessel was renamed Nimrod and entered service in October 2016.

Propulsion
Nimrod is fitted with twin Caterpillar C18 engines driving twin water jets through a pair of reduction gearboxes.

References

 

Ships built in the United Kingdom
Ships of the United Kingdom
2006 ships
Customs cutters of the United Kingdom